Jacob Ahlsson (born 3 August 1998) is a Swedish cyclist, who currently rides for UCI Continental team . His brother Jonathan is also a cyclist.

Major results
2019
 5th Time trial, National Road Championships
2020
 1st  Time trial, National Road Championships
 1st  Time trial, National Under-23 Road Championships
2021
 2nd Time trial, National Road Championships
2022
 1st  Time trial, National Road Championships

References

External links

1998 births
Living people
Swedish male cyclists
People from Kumla Municipality
21st-century Swedish people